Alfred Paget (2 June 1879 – 8 October 1919) was an English silent film actor best known for his portrayal of Prince Belshazzar in D.W. Griffith's 1916 historical epic Intolerance. He appeared in more than 230 films between 1908 and 1918. Prior to his film career, he had served from 1899 to 1903 in the Royal Horse Guards of the British Army.

He served in South Africa during the Second Boer War from July to November 1900, receiving the Queen's South Africa Medal with clasps for Cape Colony, Orange Free State, and Transvaal. In April 1918 he travelled to Canada and enrolled in the Canadian Expeditionary Force, being assigned to the 34th Fort Garry Horse Depot Squadron in Winnipeg as an instructor, being quickly promoted to the rank of Sergeant due to his previous service and experience.

Paget was married to Leila Halstead. In the summer of 1919, he contracted a form of malarial fever, and died in Winnipeg on 8 October 1919. He is buried in the Field Of Honour in Brookside Cemetery, Winnipeg.

Filmography

References

External links

Page 1 of Alfred Paget's Attestation Paper at the Library and Archives of Canada
Page 2 of Alfred Paget's Attestation Paper at the Library and Archives of Canada

1879 births
1919 deaths
British Army personnel of the Second Boer War
Burials at Brookside Cemetery (Winnipeg)
Canadian Expeditionary Force officers
English male film actors
English male silent film actors
Male actors from London
20th-century English male actors
British expatriates in Canada
British expatriate male actors in the United States